Events from the year 1845 in Ireland.

Events
18 February – Devon Commission reports to the British government on the poor living conditions of the Irish population: "in many districts their only food is the potato".
September–December – African American abolitionist Frederick Douglass makes a speaking tour of Ireland. 
9 September – previously unknown potato blight strikes the potato crop: start of the Great Famine.
1 October – Wesley College (Dublin) founded.
31 October–1 November: an emergency meeting of the Cabinet of the United Kingdom (summoned on 15 October by Sir Robert Peel, the Prime Minister of the United Kingdom) votes against Peel on the distribution of relief in Ireland, considering it would call the Corn Laws into question.
9–10 November – Peel orders the secret purchase of £100,000 worth of maize and meal from the United States for distribution in Ireland.
15 November – scientific commissioners (appointed in October) report that half the Irish potato crop has been destroyed by the blight.
20 November – a relief commission for Ireland first meets.
5 December – unable to persuade his Cabinet to repeal the Corn Laws in the face of the Great Famine, Peel tenders his resignation as Prime Minister of the United Kingdom to Queen Victoria but is reinstated days later when Lord John Russell is unable to form a government.
30 December – Queen's Colleges of Belfast, Cork and Galway are incorporated.
Bessbrook in County Armagh is established as a model village by Quaker linen manufacturer John Grubb Richardson.
Construction begins of the "Leviathan of Parsonstown", a telescope built by William Parsons, 3rd Earl of Rosse.
Work completed on the building of Crumlin Road Gaol in Belfast.

Arts and literature
Charles Lever's novel The O'Donoghue: a tale of Ireland fifty years ago is published in Dublin and St Patrick's Eve in London.

Births
23 March – John T. Browne, Mayor of Houston, Texas (died 1941).
6 April – Edward Hardman, geologist (died 1887).
10 June – David Dickson Rogers, politician in Ontario (died 1915).
17 June – Emily Lawless, writer (died 1913 in England).
1 July – James M. Bell, United States Army soldier, awarded the Medal of Honor in 1876 during the Indian Wars (died 1901).
4 July – Thomas John Barnardo, philanthropist (died 1905).
23 November – Charlotte Grace O'Brien, political and social activist, writer and plant collector (died 1909).
Full date unknown
James Carey, Fenian and informer (murdered at sea 1883).
Eglantyne Louisa Jebb, social reformer (died 1925).
James O'Kelly, nationalist politician and journalist, Irish Parliamentary Party MP (died 1916).
John Pinkerton, Irish Parliamentary Party MP (died 1908).

Deaths
22 February – William Wellesley-Pole, 3rd Earl of Mornington, politician (born 1763).
28 April – James Graham, soldier, commended for his gallantry during the Battle of Waterloo (born 1791).
13 July – Johnston Drummond, early settler of Western Australia, botanical and zoological collector (born 1820).
16 September – Thomas Osborne Davis, lawyer and writer, author of the song "A Nation Once Again" (born 1814).
17 December – Armar Lowry-Corry, 3rd Earl Belmore, politician and High Sheriff (born 1801).

References

 
1840s in Ireland
Ireland
Years of the 19th century in Ireland